Leisure Park Kallang (or Kallang Leisure Park) is an entertainment centre and shopping mall in Kallang, Singapore. It is served by Stadium MRT station and is within the vicinity of the affluent community of Tanjong Rhu. It is sited next to the Singapore Sports Hub, Kallang Theatre and Singapore Indoor Stadium.

History
Leisure Park Kallang was built in 1982 as the country's first purpose-built entertainment centre. At the time of completion, it featured a bowling alley, a three-screen cinema and an ice skating rink. Located next to the National Stadium, it served the crowds after major events there, and its popularity peaked in the 1990s, therefore had a minor renovation works in 1999 whereas the mall is still opened to shoppers, but the design seems to be terrible with the interior and shape of it. Therefore, the mall began to lose popularity three years later in 2002, when construction works for Stadium MRT commenced. Eventually, having seen businesses take a sharp decline, it was sold to Jack Investments in 2003. It shut its doors in 2004 for redevelopment works. 

The mall was reopened in 2007 and has previous tenants such as Filmgarde Cineplex, Kallang Ice World, food court Koufu, supermarket Cold Storage and bowling alley Kallang Bowl. In 2014, Level 4 of the mall was leased to voluntary welfare organisations.

See also
 List of shopping malls in Singapore

References

Kallang
1982 establishments in Singapore
Shopping malls in Singapore